Calliotropis equatorialis is a species of sea snail, a marine gastropod mollusk in the family Eucyclidae.

Description
The shell can grow to be 21 mm.

Distribution
This species occurs in the Pacific Ocean from Southern California to Peru.

References

 W.H. Dall (1908), The Mollusca and the Brachiopoda; Bulletin of the Museum of Comparative Zoology vol. XLIII no. 6, 1908
 Keen M. (1971) Sea shells of tropical West America. Marine mollusks from Baja California to Perú, ed. 2. Stanford University Press. 1064 pp
 Marshall B. A. (1979). The Trochidae and Turbinidae of the Kermadec Ridge (Mollusca: Gastropoda). New Zealand Journal of Zoology 6: 521-552 page(s): 531

External links
 To World Register of Marine Species

equatorialis
Gastropods described in 1896